Havva Elmalı (born 12 August 2003) is a Turkish female para athlete competing in the  T11  disability class middle-distance events of 400m and 1500m.

Early life
Havva Elmalı was born in Ankara, Turkey on 12 August 2003. She grew up in foster care after she was taken out at her age of four from a nursery by Selma Engin, who worked volunteerly in the nursery. The foster  family became impressed when they watched a visually impaired athlete became a world champion. They decided to engage her with sports.

Sport career
Three months after she started wit athletics, Elmalı participated in a competition, and finished first, which motivated her for further training.

She started performing running in 2016. She is trained by Turkey national team coach Hasan Deniz Kalaycı.

Elmalı became champion in the 1500m T11 event at the 2019 IPC World Junior APara Athletics Championships held in Notvil, Switzerland. 
She won the bronze medal in the 400m T11 event of the 2021 World Para Athletics European Championships in Bydgoszcz, Poland. She won another bronze medal in the 1500m T11 event.

References

2003 births
Living people
Sportspeople from Ankara
Female competitors in athletics with disabilities
Turkish blind people
Visually impaired middle-distance runners
Turkish female middle-distance runners
Paralympic athletes of Turkey
Athletes (track and field) at the 2020 Summer Paralympics
Medalists at the World Para Athletics European Championships
21st-century Turkish sportswomen